Erena Baker is a New Zealand visual artist of Te Ātiawa ki Whakarongotai and Te Āti Awa descent. Baker uses photography to explore ideas of commemoration and remembrance within Te ao Māori. She is also a member of Mata Aho Collective, a group of four artists known for their large-scale art works. As part of the collective their work has been exhibited internationally at the Royal Academy of Arts and the National Gallery of Canada.

Education 
In 2009, Baker graduated with a Masters of Māori Visual Arts from Toioho ki Āpiti School of Māori Studies at Massey University. Her thesis was on the importance of photography in Māori culture. She now works within the school as a lecturer and is based in Palmerston North.

Exhibitions 
Her first solo exhibition, entitled Pepeha, was held at Thermostat Gallery in Palmerston North.

Her photographic work Tango Whakaahua produced in 2006 is part of Auckland Art Gallery's permanent collection. The work consists of 50 self-portraits of Baker wearing a cloak by weaver Kohai Grace. 

Baker was one of the founding members of the Mata Aho Collective which formed in 2012. The group consists of Sarah Hudson, Bridget Reweti and Terri Te Tau. The first work the collective produced was Te Whare Pora in 2012. This was shown at the Adam Art Gallery and was subsequently acquisitioned into the Victoria University of Wellington Art Collection.

As part of the Mata Aho Collective Baker's work has been exhibited internationally at the National Gallery of Canada in Ottawa. The show, Àbadakone, Feu Continuel, Continuous Fire, showcased a range of works from contemporary indigenous artists.

In 2020 Erena Baker's work was included in the Auckland Art Gallery Exhibition Toi Tū Toi Ora. Her individual photography work was included alongside that which she produced with the Mata Aho Collective.

References 

New Zealand Māori artists
Year of birth missing (living people)
Living people
Massey University alumni
Academic staff of the Massey University
Te Āti Awa people